The Salim Group is Indonesia's biggest conglomerate and refers to companies where the Salim family held majority ownership. Its assets include Indofood Sukses Makmur, the world's largest instant noodle producer; Indomobil Group, one of Indonesia's largest car manufacturers; Indomaret, Indonesia's largest convenience store chain; and Bogasari, a large flour-milling operation. The group was founded in October 1972 by Sudono Salim and his junior partner Sutanto Djuhar (Lin Wenjing). The current CEO is Anthoni Salim, a son of Sudono Salim.

The Salim Group also owns major oil palm plantations (about 1,000 km2) and logging concessions. Salim Group has been involved in property development and the leisure industry for around 30 years. Its businesses include hotel and resort development, golf courses, and commercial real estate.

History

The Salim Group was closely tied to Indonesian politician and dictator Suharto, who ruled Indonesia for 31 years and was Sudono Salim's "friend and patron".  
During the May 1998 riots that led to Suharto's downfall, Sudono Salim's house was burned down and he was forced to flee to Singapore.

In 1999, the group called off talks to sell a stake in Indofood to San Miguel Corporation, the largest food and beverage conglomerate in the Philippines, because of control questions.

Projects in West Bengal

The Salim Group is involved in a number of projects in West Bengal, an eastern state of India. It is involved in the construction of Kolkata West International City. Salim and Universal Success are investors in the project, Ciputra is the developer, and Singapore-based Surbana is the project manager.

The proposal of the Salim Group for chemical hub and multi-product SEZ were cleared in principle by the board of approvals of the Union Commerce Ministry, Government of India, in October 2006.

Companies
 Elshinta Media
 PT Radio Elshinta (Elshinta Radio)
 PT Elshinta Jakarta Televisi (Elshinta TV)
 PT Majalah Elektronik Elshinta (Majalah Elshinta)
 Elshinta.com
 ElshintaShop.com
 PT XL Planet (elevenia)
 PT Elevenia Digital Teknologi Sukses (EDTS)
 PT NAP Info Lintas Nusa
 PT Asuransi Central Asia (ACA Group)
 PT Central Asia Raya (CAR)
 PT Indolife Pensiontama (Indolife)
 PT Indoritel Makmur Internasional Tbk (Indoritel)
 PT Indomarco Prismatama (Indomaret)
 PT Indomarco Adi Prima (Indomarco)
 PT Lion Super Indo (Super Indo) (51% owned by Ahold Delhaize)
 PT Nippon Indosari Corpindo Tbk (Sari Roti)
 All Fit & Popular Foods, Inc (Walter Bread)
 Sarimonde Foods Corporation (Sarimonde) (co-owned with Monde Nissin Corporation)
 PT Fastfood Indonesia Tbk (Indonesian sole franchisee of KFC and Taco Bell) (co-owned with Gelael Group)
 PT Inti Cakrawala Citra (Indogrosir)
 PT Gardenia Makmur Selaras (PrimeBread)
 PT Indoroti Prima Cemerlang (Mr. Bread)
 Mister Donut Indonesia (Indonesian franchisee of Mister Donut)
 PT Bank Ina Perdana Tbk (Bank Ina Perdana) (29,02%)
 PT Transaksi Artha Gemilang (Ottocash)
 PT Inti Dunia Sukes (I.saku)
 PT Inti Paket Prima (Indopaket)
 PT Reksa Transaksi Sukses Makmur (Ottopay)
 PT IndoArtha Perkasa Sukses (Pede.id) (co-owned with Allianz)
 PT Indo Seungli Makmur (iStyle.id) (co-owned with Lotte Corporation)
 PT Indomobil Sukses Internasional Tbk (Indomobil Group)
 PT Suzuki Indomobil Motor (Suzuki)
 PT Nissan Motor Indonesia (Nissan)
 PT Garuda Mataram Motor (Volkswagen and Audi)
 PT Kreta Indo Artha (Kia)
 PT Hino Motors Manufacturing Indonesia (Hino)
 PT Indo Truck Utama (Volvo and Renault)
 PT Indomobil Multi Jasa Tbk (IMJ)
 PT CSM Corporatama (Indorent)
 PT Indomobil Prima Energi
 PT Kyokuto Indomobil Manufacturing Indonesia (Kyokuto Manufaktur)
 PT Furukawa Indomobil Battery Manufacturing (Furukawa Battery)
 PT Central Sole Agency (Indoparts)
 PT Indobaterai Energi Indonesia (Indobattery)
 PT Indomobil Finance Indonesia (Indomobil Finance)
 PT Shinhan Indofinance
 PT Suzuki Nusantara Jaya Sentosa
 PT Indomobil Nissan Datsun Indonesia
 PT Swadharma Multi Finance (Swadharma)
 PT Indofood Sukses Makmur (Indofood)
 PT Indofood CBP Sukses Makmur Tbk (Indofood CBP)
 PT Bogasari Flour Mills (Bogasari)
 PT Inti Abadi Kemasindo (previously named PT Indofood Sukses Makmur Bogasari Flour Mills - Divisi Packaging)
 PT Salim Ivomas Pratama
 PT Nugraha Indah Citarasa Indonesia (previously named PT Nestle Indofood Citarasa Indonesia because violation of labor rights on palm oil incident)
 PT Indofood Fortuna Makmur (previously named PT Indofood Frito-Lay Makmur because violation of labor rights on palm oil incident)
 PT Indolakto (Indofood Nutrition)
 PT Anugerah Indofood Barokah Makmur (previously named PT Indofood Asahi Sukses Beverage because violation of labor rights on palm oil incident)
 PT Tirta Sukses Perkasa (Club)
 PT Arla Indofood Makmur Dairy Import (co-owned with Arla)
 Indofood Agri Resources Ltd (IndoAgri)
 Popolamama Indonesia (co-owned with Popolamama)
 Salim Palm Plantation
 PT Lotte Indonesia (co-owned with Lotte)
 PT Yakult Indonesia Persada (co-owned with Yakult)
 PT Cyberindo Aditama
 PT Mega Akses Persada (FiberStar)
 PT Total Chemindo Loka (Total)
PT Idmarco Perkasa Indonesia (idmarco.com)
 PT Bumi Resources Tbk.
 PT Bumi Resources Minerals Tbk.
 MACH Energy Australia Pty Ltd

Former companies
 Yayasan Anugerah Musik Indonesia (now owned by MNC Group)
 PT Indosiar Visual Mandiri (Indosiar) (now owned by Emtek)
 PT Indosiar Karya Media Tbk (sold to Emtek)
 PT Nuansa Karya Berita
 Tabloid Gaul
 Majalah Kort
 Majalah Story
 PT Nestle Indonesia (sold to Djarum)
 BCA Group (now owned by Djarum)
 PT Bank Central Asia Tbk
 PT BCA Finance
 BCA Finance Limited
 PT Bank BCA Syariah (BCA Syahriah)
 PT Central Santosa Finance
 PT BCA Sekuritas
 PT Asuransi Umum BCA (BCA Insurance)
 PT Asuransi Jiwa BCA (BCA Life)
 PT Indocement Tunggal Prakarsa Tbk (Indocement) (now owned by HeidelbergCement)
 PT Pepsi-Cola Indobeverages (leave from Indonesia)
 PT Indomiwon Citra Inti (now owned by Daesang Corporation 100%)
 PT Holdiko Perkasa (now owned by Reckitt)
 PT Darya Varia Laboratoria Tbk (sold to Unilab)

See also
 First Pacific

Notes

References

Palm oil production in Indonesia
Conglomerate companies of Indonesia
Indonesian companies established in 1972
Conglomerate companies established in 1972
Agriculture companies established in 1972
India–Indonesia relations